Wurmser is a surname. Notable people with the surname include:

 Meyrav Wurmser, Israeli scholar
 David Wurmser, advisor to Dick Cheney
 Juan Mauricio Wurmser, Minister of Economy and Commerce, Guatemala from 1996-98
 Léon Wurmser (1931–2020), Swiss psychoanalyst
 Dagobert Sigmund von Wurmser (1724–1797), Austrian general during the Napoleonic Wars
 Nicholas Wurmser, medieval painter from Strasbourg